Sisurcana sangayana is a species of moth of the family Tortricidae. It is found in Morona-Santiago Province, Ecuador.

The wingspan is about 28 mm. The ground colour of the forewings is pale rust brown, densely spotted whitish grey especially beyond the median fascia. The hindwings are whitish, suffused with brownish on the periphery.

Etymology
The species name refers to the type locality, Sangay an active stratovolcano.

References

Moths described in 2009
Sisurcana
Moths of South America
Taxa named by Józef Razowski